Roger James Urbahn (31 July 1934 – 27 November 1984) was a New Zealand rugby union player, cricketer, and sports journalist.

He was a member of the New Zealand national side, the All Blacks, in 1959 and 1960, playing 15 matches including three internationals. In all he scored three tries for the All Blacks. An all-round sportsman, Urbahn also played Hawke Cup cricket for Taranaki. He trained as a school teacher at Ardmore Teachers' Training College and worked in that profession until 1962, when he became a journalist, rising to become sports editor of the Taranaki Daily News. Urbahn died in New Plymouth on 27 November 1984.

References

1934 births
1984 deaths
People from Ōpunake
People educated at Stratford High School, New Zealand
New Zealand rugby union players
New Zealand international rugby union players
Taranaki rugby union players
Rugby union scrum-halves
New Zealand cricketers
20th-century New Zealand journalists
Rugby union players from Taranaki